Spangbergiella is a genus of leafhoppers in the family Cicadellidae. There are at least 4 described species in Spangbergiella.

Species
 Spangbergiella mexicana Baker, 1897
 Spangbergiella quadripunctata Lawson, 1932
 Spangbergiella viridis (Provancher, 1872)
 Spangbergiella vulnerata (Uhler, 1877)

References

 Dmitriev D (2009). "Nymphs of some Nearctic leafhoppers (Homoptera, Cicadellidae) with description of a new tribe". ZooKeys 29: 13–33.

Further reading

 

Cicadellidae genera
Hecalini